The Office of the Attorney General is a part of the government of New Brunswick.  It is charged providing legal services to all departments and agencies of the government.

The post of attorney general is the most senior legal official in New Brunswick and has existed since the creation of New Brunswick as a crown colony in 1784 and for much of contemporary history the attorney general oversaw the Department of Justice carrying the dual title of Minister of Justice, as is currently the case. Loyalist Jonathan Bliss served as the first attorney general, beginning in the late eighteenth century. 

From 2006 to 2012, the Office of the Attorney General was separated from the Department of Justice.  On February 14, 2006 when Premier Bernard Lord restructured the cabinet, largely out of necessity, the basic functions of attorney general were separated from the Justice Department so as to allow Brad Green, the only lawyer in his caucus, to take on a larger portfolio.  The Department of Justice and Consumer Affairs was established taking over responsibility for "protection of the public interest" from the Attorney General.  On October 3, 2006, Bernard Lord left office and was replaced as Premier by Shawn Graham.  Graham named T.J. Burke to be both Attorney General and Minister of Justice and Consumer Affairs, however in legislation to realign government departments passed on March 2, 2007 the Office of the Attorney General and the Department of Justice and Consumer Affairs remained separate entities.  A subsequent bill was introduced on December 19, 2007 specifying the role of the Office of the Attorney General as a separate department.

However, the subsequent premier, David Alward, remerged the two departments into the Department of Justice and Attorney General in 2012. Alward again separated these roles in 2013, when Ted Flemming was named attorney general, with Troy Lifford becoming minister of justice.

Attorneys general

References 

 List of ministers and deputy ministers by department, New Brunswick Legislative Library  (pdf)
The Dictionary of Canadian Biography Online

External links
Office of the Attorney General

Office of the Attorney General
New Brunswick
New Brunswick